First-seeded and reigning champion Pauline Betz defeated second-seeded Louise Brough 6–3, 5–7, 6–3 in the final to win the women's singles tennis title at the 1943 U.S. National Championships. The tournament was played on outdoor grass courts and held from September 1 through September 4, 1943 at the West Side Tennis Club in Forest Hills, Queens, New York.

The draw consisted of 32 players of which eight were seeded.

Seeds
The eight seeded U.S. players are listed below. Pauline Betz is the champion; others show in brackets the round in which they were eliminated.

  Pauline Betz (champion)
  Louise Brough (finalist)
  Margaret Osborne (quarterfinals)
  Doris Hart (semifinals)
  Sarah Palfrey Cooke (quarterfinals)
  Helen Bernhard (second round)
  Dorothy Bundy (semifinals)
  Mary Arnold (quarterfinals)

Draw

Final eight

References

1943
1943 in women's tennis
1943 in American women's sports
Women's Singles
Women's sports in New York (state)
Women in New York City
1943 in sports in New York City
Forest Hills, Queens